The murder of Bobby Äikiä (12 March 1995 – 14 January 2006) occurred outside Nässjö, Jönköping County, Sweden, when Äikiä, a 10-year-old Swedish boy with Fragile X syndrome, was tortured and killed by his mother and stepfather.

Background 
Bobby Äikiä's mother, Niina Äikiä, gave birth to the boy when she was 19 years old. Because of his medical condition, Äikiä was intellectually disabled and had difficulty socializing with other people. Niina regarded the child as a nuisance, regarding him more as a younger brother than as a son. A support family was assigned for Bobby that he visited each week. 

Niina eventually began dating a man named Eddy Larsson, who had previously been incarcerated for rape. Larsson enticed Niina with promises of a quiet country life in a quaint little croft with a few animals to raise, causing her to move out of her home and away from Bobby's support family to move in with Larsson. However, Niina discovered that he'd actually rented an old dilapidated croft that had no animals at all. The croft had no toilet, no hot water, minimal electricity and was heated by cab heaters and a stove.

Torture 
The couple's abuse of Äikiä is believed to have begun in autumn 2005, when Niina witnessed Larsson shove the boy's head into a plate of food after he'd grown annoyed with Bobby for not eating. The food was later revealed to be ravioli with cat food mixed into it. Äikiä was burned with cigarettes, had his genitals beaten with wooden sticks, would be electrocuted via an electric fence located in the nearby sheep pasture, had liquor forced down his throat with a funnel, had a vacuum cleaner hose placed onto his penis, and was forced to lie naked in the snow where he would sometimes have snow shoveled onto him. One particular incident recalled later by Niina involved Äikiä defecating himself, whereupon Larsson forced the boy to wear the stained underwear on his face for a day and a half.

Murder 
By December 2005, the abuse had reached a point where, in order to hide their actions, Äikiä's parents advised his school that he would be absent for an extended period of time due to illness. On 13 January 2006, after another episode of abuse, Äikiä was tied to a chair and thrown out of the house by Larsson. He was eventually brought back inside by his parents and placed in front of the stove to warm up. Sometime after, Äikiä was moved to his bedroom and placed into his bed. 

On 14 January 2006, Bobby was found dead by his mother, Niina, who believed he had died choking on a half-eaten orange. Larsson claimed to have conducted CPR on Bobby to no avail. Äikiä's parents hid his body in a nearby woodshed for several days before it was decided to pack him into the trunk of their car. After searching for a location to dispose of the body, they settled on Lake Lovsjön, south of Jönköping. The body was wrapped in chains and submerged in the lake. On 29 January 2006, the couple reported him missing after a visit to the Bäckebol shopping centre in Gothenburg. 

Soldiers from the Swedish Armed Forces were mobilized to search for Äikiä. However, when a body could not be found, suspicion turned towards Niina and Larsson. By February 2006 the two were arrested for suspicion of murder and, following Niina's confession to police, Äikiä was found under the ice in Lake Lovsjön.

Trial 
In May 2006, at the Eksjö District Court, the trial against Niina and Larsson began. Neither of the two considered themselves responsible for Bobby's death and blamed each other. The proceedings revealed that Larsson had developed an interest in sadomasochism and engaged in violent sex with Niina, who claimed that she endured sexual abuse by Larsson and that she and Bobby lived in a highly threatening situation. Larsson claimed the sexual relationship had been mutual and denied ever having assaulted Bobby or mistreating him. The trial ended with the couple's conviction for murder, aggravated assault and gross negligence causing death. In June 2006, they were sentenced to ten years imprisonment.

Aftermath 
Äikiä's death attracted a lot of media attention and strong public reactions. The Swedish tabloid newspaper Expressen organized a 30,000 rose collection from the public, which were gathered at Äikiä's funeral in Ödsmåls Church north of Stenungsund, Västra Götaland County. His body was interred at Norum Church in Stenungsund. The church was open for the public to attend at pay respects. In 2008, the Swedish parliament passed a law which sets out guidelines for the investigation of suspected child abuse involving special needs children.

In February 2008, Niina received 54,000 kronor in compensation after being attacked and cut in the face inside the prison. In January 2017, she gave birth to a child who was seized by authorities and placed in foster care, citing Niina as an unfit parent.

See also
List of solved missing person cases

References 

2006 murders in Sweden
2000s missing person cases
Child abuse resulting in death
Deaths by person in Sweden
Filicides
Incidents of violence against boys
Missing person cases in Sweden
Violence against men in Europe